Bianca Shomburg (born 17 September 1974, Hiddenhausen, North Rhine-Westphalia) is a German singer, best known for her participation in the 1997 Eurovision Song Contest.

Biography
In 1996, Shomburg took part in the international TV talent contest European Soundmix Show, which she won, as a result obtaining a recording contract with producer Harold Faltermeyer and releasing her first single, "I Believe in Love".

In 1997, she entered the German Eurovision selection with the Ralph Siegel-composed "Zeit" ("Time"), which had originally been written for Esther Ofarim. "Zeit" emerged the clear winner, and went forward to the 42nd Eurovision Song Contest, held in Dublin on 3 May. However, the song's performance in the contest was quite disappointing: it managed only an 18th-place finish of 25 entries.

Shomburg followed her Eurovision appearance with an English-language album, It's My Time, which failed to sell and remains her only album to date. Unable to make a commercial breakthrough, she subsequently largely disappeared from public view, although for a time she was a singing coach on TV reality show Deutschland sucht den Superstar. Since 2008, Shomburg has been working with country rock band Nashfield.

Discography 
Singles
1996: "I Believe in Love"
1997: "Zeit"
1997: "Only Your Love"
1998: "Ich lieb' dich mehr"
1999: "Ich glaub noch immer an Wunder"

Album
1997: It's My Time

References

External links 
 
 Nashfield website

1974 births
Living people
People from Herford (district)
Eurovision Song Contest entrants for Germany
Eurovision Song Contest entrants of 1997
21st-century German women singers